Lipki is a town in Kireyevsky District of Tula Oblast, Russia, located  south of Tula, the administrative center of the oblast. Population:

History
The village of Lipki has been known since at least the 17th century. In 1949, it was granted urban-type settlement status due to the development of coal deposits. It was granted town status in 1955.

Administrative and municipal status
Within the framework of administrative divisions, it is, together with one rural locality (the settlement of Komsomolsky), incorporated within Kireyevsky District as Lipki Town Under District Jurisdiction. As a municipal division, Lipki Town Under District Jurisdiction is incorporated within Kireyevsky Municipal District as Lipki Urban Settlement.

References

Sources

Notes

Cities and towns in Tula Oblast
Populated places established in the 17th century